Rosmarie Bleuer (16 March 1926 – 26 February 2021) was a Swiss alpine skier who competed in the 1948 Winter Olympics. Bleuer died in February 2021 at the age of 94.

References 

1926 births
2021 deaths
Alpine skiers at the 1948 Winter Olympics
Olympic alpine skiers of Switzerland
Swiss female alpine skiers
20th-century Swiss women